DDTV (Direct Digital TV, frequently mistaken for Dan Diaconescu TV) was a Romanian free-to-air entertainment television channel, founded by Dan Diaconescu in 2005. Unlike its sister channel, OTV, most of DDTV's programming consisted of classic animated series, being aimed at children between 4 and 10 years old.

Overview
Launched in 2005, the channel did broadcast talk shows, such as "Deșteptarea României" and "Dan Diaconescu Direct", which also aired on OTV. In the summer of 2009, it was announced that DDTV will be rebranded with a completely new programming schedule, getting rid of the talk shows it did broadcast. The rebrand took place on 23 August 2009. In mornings and afternoons, the channel was broadcasting animated shorts, mostly public domain cartoons from Fleischer Studios, Famous Studios, Van Beuren, ComiColor Cartoons, Flip the Frog, The Gumby Show (most of them being 60s cartoons with the 80s track, plus some episodes from the "revival") and some from Soyuzmultfilm (such as Nu, pogodi!). There were also some exceptions of illegally copyrighted material being aired, like Hanna-Barbera's Yogi Bear and Huckleberry Hound, Joe Oriolo's Felix the Cat TV series (plus even some episodes of The Twisted Tales of Felix the Cat) and Casper the Friendly Ghost theatrical shorts (apparently taken from the Casper and Wendy's Ghostly Adventures VHS release). In the evenings and nights, it did broadcast movies and documentaries targeted at teenagers.

The channel was closed on 24 February 2014, because  its audiovisual license wasn't extended.

Criticism 
In September 2009, DDTV was fined by CNA with 50,000 RON for broadcasting content (from Warner Bros.) without having the necessary rights to broadcast them, after Warner Bros. notified CNA about this problem.

After OTV was closed by the CNA, Diaconescu used DDTV to broadcast the programs usually shown on OTV and CNA fined DDTV 100,000 lei (25,000 euros) in October 2013.

References

External links
 https://web.archive.org/web/20180426135705/http://www.ddtv.home.ro/
 mms://82.76.12.224:8081 Live feed (Windows Media)

Defunct television channels in Romania
Romanian companies established in 2009
2014 disestablishments in Romania
Television channels and stations established in 2009
Television channels and stations disestablished in 2014

hu:DDTV (Románia)
sk:DDTV (Rumunsko)